The mountain leaf warbler (Phylloscopus trivirgatus) is a songbird species from the leaf warbler family (Phylloscopidae). It was formerly included in the "Old World warbler" assemblage.

It is found in Indonesia and Malaysia. Its natural habitats are subtropical or tropical moist lowland forest and subtropical or tropical moist montane forest.

References

mountain leaf warbler
Birds of Malesia
mountain leaf warbler
Taxonomy articles created by Polbot